Lachesis (also known as the bushmasters) is a genus of venomous pit vipers found in forested areas of the Neotropics. The scientific name refers to one of the Three Fates, Lachesis (in Greek mythology), who determined the length of the thread of life. Four species are currently recognized.

Taxonomy
The genus was traditionally composed of only threes species, but Campbell and Lamar (2004) described a fourth species, L. acrochorda (García, 1896), referring to it as the Chochoan bushmaster. Its evolutionary relationships are not certain, but Lachesis acrochorda is thought to be closer to L. muta than to the two Central American species L. stenophrys and L. melanocephala.

Species 

*) Not including the nominate subspecies.
T) Type species.

Description
L. muta is possibly the largest of the four species currently recognized, although more scant information suggest L. stenophrys broadly overlaps in size and may average at a similar size, while L. melanocephala and L. acrochorda are apparently slightly smaller than the prior two species. Although they are not the heaviest vipers, since the Gaboon viper (Bitis gabonica) and the eastern diamondback rattlesnake (Crotalus adamanteus) are heavier, large adults can weigh . Bushmasters are sexually dimorphic in size, with males reaching larger sizes than females. The bushmasters' tail ends with a horny spine which sometimes vibrates when disturbed like rattlesnakes; due to this, it has been called 'the mute rattlesnake'.

Geographic range
Lachesis species are found in Central and South America, as well as the island of Trinidad in the Caribbean.

Reproduction
Bushmasters lay eggs: about a dozen in an average clutch. The female reportedly remains with her eggs during incubation and may aggressively defend the nest if approached. The hatchlings average  in length and are more colorful than the adults. Lachesis is thought to be unique among New World pit vipers by laying eggs rather than giving birth to live young, although some evidence suggests that the species Bothrocophias colombianus found in Colombia may do the same.

Venom
This snake is capable of multiple-bite strikes and the injection of large amounts of venom. Even the bite of a juvenile specimen can be fatal to a human. However, this snake is rarely encountered, so snakebite incidents are not common. The venom of Lachesis has several activities, such as the activation of plasminogen, leading to increased permeability of blood vessels, causing edema and lowering of blood pressure. It also has coagulant activity in which thrombin-like enzymes act on fibrinogen, forming small clots that settle in organs such as lungs and kidneys, obstructing capillary blood flow. Hemorrhagic activity is caused by metalloproteases, which damage capillary walls. Both coagulant and hemorrhagic activities act in combination, triggering local and systemic hemorrhagic disorders. Proteolytic activity is due to direct action of proteases (thrombin for example), metalloproteases, and important myotoxic and cytolytic factors. Myotoxic action occurs due to phospholipase generating an inflammatory infiltrate composed of polymorphonuclear leukocytes and macrophages around necrotic cells. Phospholipases can induce necrosis of skeletal muscle fibers. While the defibrinating action results in anticoagulant blood, the venom also has a kininogen-like action; it causes the body to release substances such as bradykinin and kallikrein inducing hypotension. Bradykinin-enhancing peptides interfere with the bradykinin metabolism causing it to last longer in the blood, leading to lasting hypotension. The venom also has a neurotoxic action, isolated from basic phospholipase, that is capable of inducing irreversible blockage of neuromuscular transmission in vitro at concentrations as low as 1 mg/ml.

Cultural depictions 
The bushmaster snake is the antagonist in the tenth episode of the old time radio show Escape. The episode's title was "A Shipment of Mute Fate", and starred Jack Webb and Raymond Lawrence. It was broadcast on 15 October 1947. The story was also adapted for Suspense starring Jack Kelly, broadcast on January 6, 1957. 

Jack T. Colton killed a bushmaster in the film Romancing the Stone from 1984 when seeking shelter in a crashed plane.

The Marvel Comics supervillain Bushmaster is named after the genus.

The following weapons and military vehicles are named after this viper:
 M242 Bushmaster, a chain gun manufactured by Northrop Grumman Innovation Systems;
 Bushmaster IMV, an Australian infantry mobility vehicle; 
 A variant of the amphibious Landing Vehicle Tracked introduced in 1944, the LVT-3 Bushmaster.

References

Further reading

 Eatherley, Dan. Bushmaster: Raymond Ditmars and the Hunt for the World's Largest Viper. 2015 (Arcade: New York City)
 Mehrtens, J.M. Living Snakes of the World in Color. New York: Sterling Publishers. 1987. 480 pp. .
 O'Shea, Mark. Venomous Snakes of the World. Princeton University Press. 2005. 160 pp. .

External links

 

 
Snakes of South America
Snakes of Central America
Reptiles of Nicaragua
Snake genera
Taxa named by François Marie Daudin